Walking Cloud and Deep Red Sky, Flag Fluttered and the Sun Shined is an album by Mono, released in 2004.

The album comes with origami paper and instructions on how to fold a paper crane, a reference to the last track on the album: "A Thousand Paper Cranes".

Track listing

Personnel
Mono
 Takaakira "Taka" Goto – lead guitar, string arrangements
 Yoda (Hideki Suematsu) – rhythm guitar
 Tamaki Kunishi – bass
 Yasunori Takada – drums

Additional musicians
 Inger Peterson Carle – violin
 John Sagos – violin
 Susan Voelz – violin
 Vannia Phillips – viola
 Alison Chesley – cello
 Udai Shika – string arrangements

Technical
 Steve Albini – engineer, mixer
 John Golden – masterer

References

2004 albums
Mono (Japanese band) albums
Albums produced by Steve Albini